Dichaea glauca is a species of orchid.

References 

glauca
Orchids of Central America
Orchids of Belize